A proverbial name is a type of given name formation in some cultures of Africa. A proverbial name is a name which is condensed from a proverb, proverbial phrase, or a philosophical statement. An example from the Urhobo culture: Okeremute ("there is time for everything")

References

Relevant literature
Akinnaso, F. Niyi. "Names and naming principles in cross-cultural perspective." Names 29, no. 1 (1981): 37-63.
Fasiku, Gbenga. "Yoruba Proverbs, Names and Consciousness." Journal of Pan African Studies 1, no.4 (2006).
Musere, Jonathan. "Proverbial Names of the Baganda." Names 46, no. 1 (1998): 73-79.
Ojoade, J. Olowo. “African proverbial names: 101 Ilaje Examples.” Names 28, no. 3 (1980): 195-214.
Simelane-Kalumba, Phumzile Innocentia. The use of proverbial names among the Xhosa society: Socio-cultural approach. PhD diss., University of Western Cape, 2014.

 
Given name types